A project of Constitution for the Cisalpine Republic, which later evolved and was adopted as the Italian Constitution of 1802, was draft on 7 October 1801.

See also
Constitution of Italy

External links
Text of the draft 

Law of Italy
Cisalpine Republic
1801 in law
1801 in Europe